Tatyana Lvovna Piletskaya  PAR (born July 2, 1928) is a Soviet and Russian film and stage actress. She was born in Leningrad, USSR.

References

External links
 

1928 births
Living people
Russian film actresses
Russian stage actresses
Soviet actresses
People's Artists of Russia
Honored Artists of the RSFSR
Recipients of the Order of Honour (Russia)
Actresses from Saint Petersburg
20th-century Russian women